The David Adler Lectureship Award in the Field of Materials Physics is a prize that has been awarded annually by the American Physical Society since 1988.  The recipient is chosen for "an outstanding contributor to the field of materials physics, who is noted for the quality of his/her research, review articles and lecturing."  The prize is named after physicist David Adler with contributions to the endowment by friends of David Adler and major support from Energy Conversion Devices, Inc., as well as support from the American Physical Society's Division of Materials Physics. The prize includes a $5,000 honorarium.

Recipients 
Source: American Physical Society

 2022 Axel Hoffmann
 2021 Robert Cava
 2020 Chang-Beom Eom
 2019 Giulia Galli
 2018 Christopher J. Palmstrǿm
 2017 Heike E. Riel
 2016 Harry A. Atwater
 2015 Jacqueline Krim
 2014 Paul Canfield
 2013 Jean-Luc Bredas
 2012 Stuart Parkin
 2011 Stephen Pearton
 2010 Patricia Thiel
 2009 Salvatore Torquato
 2008 Karin Rabe
 2007 Samuel D. Bader
 2006 James R. Chelikowsky
 2005 Ramamoorthy Ramesh
 2004 Chia-Ling Chien
 2003 Ivan K. Schuller
 2002 Chris G. Van de Walle
 2001 Ellen D. Williams (scientist)
 2000 Bertram Batlogg
 1999 Leonard C. Feldman
 1998 Joe Greene
 1997 John D. Joannopoulos
 1996 M. Brian Maple
 1995 Marc A. Kastner
 1994 Max Lagally
 1993 Simon C. Moss
 1992 Robert A. Street
 1991 John R. Smith
 1990 Michael Schluter
 1989 Robert W. Balluffi
 1988 Jan Tauc

See also
 List of physics awards

References

External links 
 David Adler Lectureship Award in the Field of Materials Physics, American Physical Society

Awards of the American Physical Society
Materials science awards